Retention uniformity, or RU, is a concept in thin layer chromatography. It is designed for the quantitative measurement of equal-spreading of the spots on the chromatographic plate and is one of the Chromatographic response functions.

Formula
Retention uniformity is calculated from the following formula:

where n is the number of compounds separated, Rf (1...n) are the Retention factor of the compounds sorted in non-descending order.

Theoretical considerations 

The coefficient lies always in range <0,1> and 0 indicates worst case of separation (all Rf values equal to 0 or 1), value 1 indicates ideal equal-spreading of the spots, for example (0.25,0.5,0.75) for three solutes, or (0.2,0.4,0.6,0.8) for four solutes.

This coefficient was proposed as an alternative to earlier approaches, such as D (separation response), Ip (performance index) or Sm (informational entropy). Besides its stable range, the advantage is a stable distribution as a random variable, regardless of compounds investigated.

In contrast to the similar concept called Retention distance, Ru is insensitive to Rf values close to 0 or 1, or close to themselves. If two values are not separated, it still indicates some uniformity of chromatographic system. For example, the Rf values (0,0.2,0.2,0.3) (two compounds not separated at 0.2 and one at the start ) result in RU equal to 0.3609.

See also 

 Chromatographic response function

References

 Komsta Ł., Markowski W., Misztal G., A proposal for new RF equal-spread criteria with stable distribution parameters as a random variable. J. Planar Chromatogr. 2007 (20) 27-37.

Chromatography